"Another Weekend" is the name of a 1988 hit single by the British pop group Five Star. It peaked at #18 on the UK singles chart, but reached #1 on the UK Dance chart. In the US, the single reached #23 on the R&B charts.

The single was a return to the charts for the group after a short break to record their fourth LP Rock the World. Due to declining record sales, the group were intent on changing their clean-cut image. They opted for a new, raunchier leather-clad look in the accompanying video, whilst the track demonstrated a slightly harder edged dance sound. However, the changes were not enough to reverse the group's decline, and sales continued to dwindle.

7" single PB42081 and 7" gatefold with stickers:

1. Another Weekend (Edit) 04:10

2. The Mews

12" single: PT42082

1. Another Weekend (Friday Night Mix)

2. Another Weekend (Friday Night Dub Mix)

3. The Mews

2nd 12" single with posterbag: PT42082PB

1. Another Weekend (Saturday Night Mix)  

2. The Mews (Edit)

3. The Five Star Hit Mix, 11:52 (Disco Mix Club megamix featuring Can't Wait Another Minute, Let Me Be The One, All Fall Down, Whenever You're Ready, Find The Time, If I Say Yes, R.S.V.P., Love Take Over, The Slightest Touch)   ***

US 12" single and cassette single: 8854-4-RS (1989)

1. Another Weekend (Friday Night Mix / 12" Mix)

2. Another Weekend (7" Edit)

3. Another Weekend (Saturday Night Mix) 

4. Another Weekend (Friday Night Dub Mix)

5. U

All tracks available on the remastered versions of either the 2012 'Rock The World' album, the 2013 'The Remix Anthology (The Remixes 1984-1991)' or the 2018 'Luxury - The Definitive Anthology 1984-1991' boxset.

***  Available on the 2012 Cherry Pop reissue of the Between The Lines album

Five Star songs
1988 singles
Songs written by Leon Sylvers III
1988 songs